Belleville Township is a township in Chautauqua County, Kansas, USA.  As of the 2000 census, its population was 675.

Geography
According to the USGS, it contains seven cemeteries: Booth, Findley, Marshall, McClarney, Oak Grove, Oak Hill and Peru.

The streams of Harper Creek, Otter Creek and Possum Trot Creek run through this township.

Transportation
Belleville Township contains one airport or landing strip, Walter Landing Strip.

References
 USGS Geographic Names Information System (GNIS)

External links
 US-Counties.com
 City-Data.com

Townships in Chautauqua County, Kansas
Townships in Kansas